The 2019 Lyon bombing took place on 24 May 2019 in Lyon, France. The bomb exploded near a bakery on a busy street and the blast wounded 14 people. Eleven victims were sent to hospitals. The youngest victim was an eight-year-old girl who suffered light injuries. Police authorities closed the nearby Victor Hugo and Bellecour metro stations.

Investigation 
Authorities opened an inquiry to investigate the incident as a terrorist attack. According to experts, the explosive used for the bomb was of a type which has been used in jihadist attacks in France such as the November 2015 Paris attacks.

Suspect 
A suspect was arrested three days later at a bus stop in Lyon and he admitted to investigators that he carried out the bombing. On 20 May 2019, The New York Times reported that the suspect, named Mohamed M., told investigators he had pledged allegiance to the Islamic State.  According to interior minister Christophe Castaner, the suspect was previously unknown to security services. He was charged with attempted murder and multiple terrorist crimes.

Aftermath 
On 24 May 2019, president Emmanuel Macron expressed his sympathy for the victims.

References

2019 crimes in France
2019 bombing
2019 bombing
ISIL terrorist incidents in France
Islamic terrorist incidents in 2019
Terrorist incidents in France in 2019
Improvised explosive device bombings in France
May 2019 crimes in Europe
May 2019 events in France